{{Infobox darts player
| name = Rhian O'Sullivan
| image =
| fullname =
| nickname =
| birth_date = 
| birth_place = Swansea, Wales
| death_date =
| death_place = 
| hometown = Llanelli, Wales
| since = 1999
| darts = 23 Gram
| laterality = Right-handed
| music = "Delilah" by Tom Jones
| BDO = 2008–2020
| PDC =
| WDF = 2008–
| currentrank = 
| BDO World = Runner Up: 2010, 2011
| World Masters = Quarter Final: 2009
| World Darts Trophy = Last 16: 2018
| Dutch Open = Runner-up: 2022
| Int. Darts League =
| PDC World =
| Matchplay =
| Grand Prix =
| UK Open =
| Vegas =
| Premier League =
| US Open =
| results = {{aligned table|leftright=y|fullwidth=y|class=nowrap 
| Turkish Open | 2010, 2012
| England National Singles | 2022
}}
| medaltemplates =

}}Rhian O'Sullivan (née Edwards'''; 20 January 1981) is a Welsh female professional darts player who plays in events of the World Darts Federation (WDF).

Darts career
O'Sullivan was a quarter finalist in the 2009 Women's World Masters. She qualified for her first BDO Women's World Championship in 2010. She defeated fellow Welshwoman Julie Gore 2–0 in the quarter-finals, and Karen Lawman 2–0 in the semi-finals. In the final, she was beaten 2–0 by Trina Gulliver.

In 2011, she again reached the World Championship final after victories over Gore in the quarter-finals and Deta Hedman in the semi-finals. She was beaten 2–0 by Gulliver for the second final in a row.

In 2012, O'Sullivan was defeated in the first round by top seed and eventual runner-up Hedman. She hit the highest checkout (155) recorded in the history of the women's world finals. The record wasbeaten in 2014.

Personal life
O'Sullivan is not a full-time professional darts player, and works as a childcare nursery nurse.

World Championship results

BDO/WDF
 2010: Runner-up (lost to Trina Gulliver 0–2) (sets) 
 2011: Runner-up (lost to Trina Gulliver 0–2)
 2012: First round (lost to Deta Hedman 1–2)
 2022: Semi-finals (lost to Kirsty Hutchinson 2–3)
 2023:

References

External links

Living people
Welsh darts players
1981 births
British Darts Organisation players
Professional Darts Corporation women's players